RC & The Gritz are an American soul, R&B, and hip-hop band with origins in Dallas, Texas. Led by RC Williams, the band was formed in 2004. RC & the Gritz currently provide live instrumentation for Erykah Badu.

History 
RC's professional career began at the age of 19 by joining Kirk Franklin's 25-member choir, God's Property. The choir was a commercially successful gospel group, and winner of accolades including Dove, Grammy, and Stellar awards. God's Property is well-known for their Grammy-winning hit, "Stomp".

During the early 2000s, RC assumed the role of music director, producer, and keyboardist for Erykah Badu. RC and other members of the newly formed Gritz band began hosting an open mic and jam session, after connecting with producer Jah Born. Born also contributed to Badu's discography (known most for his production behind the single "On & On" from the Baduizm album). This weekly event exposed some of the talent in Dalla-Ft. Worth Metroplex, and was frequently visited by friends of the band including Mos Def, Talib Kweli, and other hip-hop artists. The event took place at the now defunct Prophet Bar in the Deep Ellum area of Dallas.

RC & The Gritz independently released their debut album Pay Your Tab in 2013 containing the single "That Kinda Girl" which featured Snoop Dogg and Raheem DeVaughn. The band also worked with artists such as Sarah Jaffe, Bernard Wright, Shaun Martin, and Shelley Carrol on their follow up album and first release under the Ropeadope label, The Feel in 2016.  

In 2019, Devin the Dude, Bobby Sessions, and N'Dambi all make appearances on the third release from the Grtiz, Analog World, also released under the Philadelphia-based Ropeadope. The album Live In LA was performed and recorded live during a pop-up show in Hollywood, California.

Members 

RC & The Gritz has eight primary members and 11 rotating members.

Primary
 RC Williams – Keys, Vocals
 Cleon Edwards – Drums
 Braylon Lacy – Bass
 Jah Born – Programmer/MPC
 Jonathan Mones – Alto Sax, Flute
 Claudia Melton – Vocals
 Evan Knight – Sax
 Mike Jelani Brooks – Tenor Saxophone, Flute

Rotating
 Miracle Foster – (Vocals)
 Durand Bernarr – Vocals
 Matt Ramsey – Bass
 Mark Lettieri – Guitar
 Bianca Rodriguez – Vocals
 A.J. Brown – Bass
 Nicholas Rothouse – Percussion
 Kazunori Tanaka – Trumpet
 Mike Clowes – Guitar
 Marcus Jones – Drums
 Frank Moka- Percussion

Discography 
 Pay Your Tab (Independent, 2013)
 The Feel (Ropeadope, 2016)
 Analog World (Ropeadope, 2019)
 Live In LA (Spectrasonics) (Independent, 2019)
 Live in Deep Ellum (2021)

References

External links 
 

American jazz ensembles from Texas
Musical groups established in 2004
Jazz fusion ensembles
Jazz musicians from Texas
Musical groups from Dallas
African-American musical groups